Paretroplus nourissati, the lamena, is a species of cichlid from the vicinity of the confluence of the Amboaboa and Mangarahara Rivers near Mandritsara in northern Madagascar. P. nourissati is threatened by habitat loss and invasive species.

Like other members of the lamena group, it is a rheophile (although less so than Oxylapia polli), and typically found in river sections that are shallow, clear and fast-flowing. P. gymnopreopercularis is found in the same region, but it appears to be restricted to deeper pools in the river. A member of another cichlid genus, Ptychochromis insolitus, is also restricted to the region.

The specific name honours the cichlid aquarist Jean Claude Nourissat (1942-2003).

References

nourissati
Freshwater fish of Madagascar
Fish described in 1998
Taxonomy articles created by Polbot